The 2020 Port Adelaide Football Club season was the club's 24th season in the Australian Football League (AFL) and the 150th year since its inception in 1870. The club would ordinarily have fielded its reserves team in the South Australian National Football League (SANFL), though was prevented from doing so as a result of the COVID-19 pandemic.

Squad

AFL

SANFL

AFL season

Pre-season

Regular season

 Due to the COVID-19 pandemic, the AFL reduced the season to 17 rounds and played some matches behind closed doors.

Ladder

Finals series

SANFL season (cancelled)

Port Adelaide's reserves team, known as the Magpies, had been fixtured for another season in the SANFL. In May 2020 however the AFL ordered all AFL-listed players not to play in any state league, preventing Port Adelaide from fielding their SANFL team for the 2020 season.

Awards

Power (AFL)
  – Darcy Byrne-Jones
  – Travis Boak
  – Zak Butters
  – Trent McKenzie
  – Justin Westhoff

Notes

References

External links
 Official website of the Port Adelaide Football Club
 Official website of the Australian Football League

2020
Port Adelaide Football Club